Anders Paulrud (14 May 1951 – 6 January 2008) was a Swedish writer and journalist, born in Karlskrona. He died of lung cancer in January 2008.

Bibliography
 Det regnar i Wimbledon (1994)
 Amamamor (1996) 
 Inbjudan till sorg (2000) 
 Ett ögonblicks verk (2003) 
 Kärleken till Sofia Karlsson (2005) 
 Som vi älskade varandra (2007) 
 Fjärilen i min hjärna (2008)

External links
Författaren Anders Paulrud är död (in Swedish)

1951 births
2008 deaths
Deaths from lung cancer
People from Karlskrona
20th-century Swedish journalists